Shawn Mendes: The Tour was the fourth concert tour by Canadian singer Shawn Mendes, in support of his self-titled third studio album (2018). The tour began in Amsterdam, Netherlands at the Ziggo Dome on March 7, 2019, and concluded in Mexico City, Mexico at the Palacio de los Deportes on December 21, 2019.

The September 6 show at the Rogers Centre in Mendes' hometown of Toronto, Canada, was recorded and released as a Netflix-original concert film titled, "Shawn Mendes: Live In Concert", on November 25, 2020.

Background and development
After the announcement of his self-titled third studio album, Mendes announced he would embark his fourth concert tour. Dates were first announced for Europe and North America on May 8, 2018. Due to overwhelming demand, extra dates were added to Amsterdam, Dublin, and London. On July 17, 2018, dates were announced for Oceania. Extra dates were added in Melbourne and Sydney due to high demand. On December 3, 2018, Mendes announced he would headline his first stadium show in his hometown of Toronto. In a matter of minutes, the show was sold out, marking his biggest show to date.

On January 16, 2019, dates were announced for Latin America. Additional dates in São Paulo, Buenos Aires, Santiago and Mexico City were added due to the high demand. On February 21, 2019, Mendes announced that the R&B singer and friend, Alessia Cara, would be the opening act for Europe and selected dates in North America. He also added 16 additional shows in North America that included new dates in Edmonton, Saskatoon, Winnipeg, Milwaukee, Ottawa, Columbus, Philadelphia, two shows in Uncasville, and second shows in Rosemont, Los Angeles, Oakland, Newark, Boston, Montreal, and Brooklyn. On March 28, 2019, Mendes announced American country duo Dan + Shay as the opening act for Oceania, with the exception of the Brisbane and Auckland shows where Australian singer-songwriter Ruel would perform. On April 22, 2019, dates were announced for Asia. On May 28, Mendes announced Alessia Cara as the opening act for the Canadian dates of the tour, making her the opening act for all the North American concerts.

Critical reception
In a positive review, Graeme Virtue, writing for The Guardian gave the concert 4 out of 5 stars, stating, “The unstoppable rise of the clean-cut Canadian continues with a set of confessional ballads and grand romantic gestures”,  for the show at SSE Hydro, Glasgow. Leslie Ken Chu from Exclaim! praised Mendes for sharing "uplifting, motivational messages about self-empowerment, but he bucked convention by keeping his verbiage short", for the concert at Rogers Arena, Vancouver.

Accolades

Set list
This set list is representative of the show on July 6, 2019 in Los Angeles. It is not intended to represent all shows throughout the tour.
 "Lost in Japan"
 "There's Nothing Holdin' Me Back"
 "Nervous"
 "Stitches"
 "Señorita" / "I Know What You Did Last Summer" / "Mutual"
 "Bad Reputation"
 "Never Be Alone"
 "I Wanna Dance with Somebody (Who Loves Me)" / "Because I Had You" / "A Little Too Much" / "Patience" / "When You’re Ready"
 "Life of the Party"
 "Like to Be You"
 "Ruin"
 "Treat You Better"
 "Particular Taste"
 "Where Were You in the Morning?"
 "Fallin’ All in You"
 "Youth"
 "If I Can't Have You"
 "Why"
 "Mercy"
Encore
  "Fix You" / "In My Blood"

Tour dates

Cancelled shows

References

2019 concert tours
Shawn Mendes concert tours